In certain computer programming languages, the Elvis operator, often written ?:, is a binary operator that returns its first operand if that operand evaluates to a true value, and otherwise evaluates and returns its second operand. This is identical to a short-circuit or with "last value" semantics. The notation of the Elvis operator was inspired by the ternary conditional operator, ? : since the Elvis operator expression A ?: B is approximately equivalent to the ternary conditional A ? A : B.

The name "Elvis operator" refers to the fact that when its common notation, ?:, is viewed sideways, it resembles an emoticon of Elvis Presley with his signature hairstyle.

A similar operator is the null coalescing operator, where the boolean truth check is replaced with a check for non-null instead. This is usually written ??, and can be seen in languages like C#.

Alternative syntaxes 
In several languages, such as Common Lisp, Clojure, Lua, Object Pascal, Perl, Python, Ruby, and JavaScript, the OR operator (typically || or or) has the same behavior as the above: returning its first operand if it would evaluate to true in a boolean environment, and otherwise evaluating and returning its second operand. When the left hand side is true, the right hand side is not even evaluated; it is "short-circuited."  This is different than the behavior in other languages such as C/C++, where the result of || will always be a boolean.

Example

Boolean variant
In a language that supports the Elvis operator, something like this:
 x = f() ?: g() 

will set x equal to the result of f() if that result is a true value, and to the result of g() otherwise.

It is equivalent to this example, using the conditional ternary operator:
 x = f() ? f() : g() 

except that it does not evaluate the f() twice if it is true.

Object reference variant

This code will result in a reference to an object that is guaranteed to not be null. Function f() returns an object reference instead of a boolean, and may return null:
 x = f() ?: "default value"

Languages supporting the Elvis operator
 Perl since version v5.10 provides the Logical Defined Or operator: //, equivalent to defined $a ? $a : $b 
 In GNU C and C++ (that is: in C and C++ with GCC extensions), the second operand of the ternary operator is optional. This has been the case since at least GCC 2.95.3 (March 2001), and seems to be the original elvis operator.
 In Apache Groovy, the "Elvis operator" ?: is documented as a distinct operator; this feature was added in Groovy 1.5 (December 2007). Groovy, unlike GNU C and PHP, does not simply allow the second operand of ternary ?: to be omitted; rather, binary ?: must be written as a single operator, with no whitespace in between.
 In PHP, it is possible to leave out the middle part of the ternary operator since PHP 5.3. (June 2009).
 The Fantom programming language has the ?: binary operator that compares its first operand with null.
 In Kotlin, the Elvis operator returns its left-hand side if it is not null, and its right-hand side otherwise. A common pattern is to use it with return, like this: val foo = bar() ?: return
 In Gosu, the ?: operator returns the right operand if the left is null as well.
 In C#, the null-conditional operator, ?. is referred to as the "Elvis operator", but it does not perform the same function. Instead, the null-coalescing operator ?? does.
 In ColdFusion and CFML, the Elvis operator was introduced using the ?: syntax.
 The Xtend programming language has an Elvis operator.
 In Google's Closure Templates, the Elvis operator is a null coalescing operator, equivalent to isNonnull($a) ? $a : $b.
 In Ballerina, the Elvis operator L ?: R returns the value of L if it's not nil. Otherwise, return the value of R.
 In JavaScript, the nullish coalescing (??) operator is a logical operator that returns its right-hand side operand when its left-hand side operand is null or undefined, and otherwise returns its left-hand side operand.

See also
?: or conditional operator, when used as a ternary operator
Safe navigation operator, often ?.
Spaceship operator <=>
Option type

References

Articles with example code
Binary operations
Conditional constructs
Operators (programming)
Elvis Presley